Polyura hebe, the plain nawab, is a butterfly belonging to the brush-footed butterflies family (Nymphalidae).

Subspecies
P. h. hebe (Butler, 1866) – Sumatra
P. h. ganymedes (Staudinger, 1886) – Borneo
P. h. fallax (Röber, 1894) – Java
P. h. fallacides (Fruhstorfer, 1895) – Nias
P. h. plautus (Fruhstorfer, 1898) – Singapore
P. h. chersonesus (Fruhstorfer, 1898) – Peninsular Malaya, Thailand, Burma
P. h. lombokianus (Fruhstorfer, 1898) – Lombok
P. h. arnoldi (Rothschild, 1899) – Sumba
P. h. kangeanus (Fruhstorfer, 1903) – Kangean Island
P. h. baweanicus (Fruhstorfer, 1906) – Bawean
P. h. nikias (Fruhstorfer, 1914) – Bali
P. h. clavata (van Eecke, 1918) – Simeulue
P. h. quaesita Corbet, 1942 – Sipora Island
P. h. takizawai Hanafusa, 1987

Description
In these medium-sized, heavy-bodies butterflies the outer edge of the forewings is concave, with a pointed apex and the hindwings show two short tails. The upperside of the wings is greenish white. A broad dark brown apical border, wide at the apex, but decreasing in width towards the base of the costa, forms a wide internal greenish-white band. Also the hindwings show a broad dark brown border, with submarginal small white marks. The underside is brown and has a wide pale silvery-green median patch. The caterpillar is bright green and has a black four-horned head.

Biology
Larva feeds on several plant of the family Leguminosae, sub-family Mimosoideae, mainly red saga (Adenanthera pavonina), Albizia falcata, Falcataria moluccana, and petai (Parkia speciosa).

Distribution
This species can be found in Burma, Malaysia, Thailand, Singapore, Java, Sumatra, Bali, and Borneo.

References

External links
 Pteron World

Polyura
Butterflies of Indochina
Butterflies described in 1866
Taxa named by Arthur Gardiner Butler